Johan Clarey (born 8 January 1981) is a French World Cup alpine ski racer. He specializes in the speed events of downhill and super-G.

Clarey finished fifth and was injured the following week at Kitzbühel and missed the remainder of the 2013 season, including the world championships.

In the winter of 2014–15, Clarey was in the top 10 three times in World Cup races and twice in the winter of 2015–16. He was again on the podium on January 2017 in Kitzbühel. At age forty in January 2021, Clarey finished second in the downhill at Kitzbühel to become the oldest ever to make a World Cup podium, his eighth. One year later he again finished second in a Kitzbühel downhill race, thus beating his own age record.

At the 2022 Winter Olympics in China, 41-year-old Clarey was the silver medalist in the downhill, one-tenth of a second back.

World Cup results

Season standings

Race podiums
 0 wins
 11 podiums – (10 DH, 1 SG); 63 top tens

World Championship results

Olympic results

Video
You Tube – Johan Clarey sets alpine ski record – Universal Sports – 19 January 2013

References

External links

French Ski Team – 2023 men's A team 
Johan Clarey at Head Skis
 

Living people
1981 births
Sportspeople from Annecy
French male alpine skiers
Olympic alpine skiers of France
Alpine skiers at the 2010 Winter Olympics
Alpine skiers at the 2014 Winter Olympics
Alpine skiers at the 2018 Winter Olympics
Alpine skiers at the 2022 Winter Olympics
Medalists at the 2022 Winter Olympics
Olympic medalists in alpine skiing
Olympic silver medalists for France